The Central District of Harsin County is a district (bakhsh) in Harsin County, Kermanshah Province, Iran. At the 2006 census, its population was 65,659, in 15,030 families.  The District has one city: Harsin. The District has two rural districts (dehestan): Cheshmeh Kabud Rural District and Howmeh Rural District.

References 

Harsin County
Districts of Kermanshah Province